Charan Boro is a Bodoland People's Front politician from Assam. He was elected in Assam Legislative Assembly election in 2016 from Majbat constituency.
He was born in Rangagarah area of Udalguri district on 1 July 1979. His father's name is Nabin Boro and mother's name is Ampuli Boro.

References 

Living people
Bodoland People's Front politicians
People from Udalguri district
Assam MLAs 2016–2021
Year of birth missing (living people)
Assam MLAs 2021–2026